Boluwatife Akinyode (born 30 May 1994) is a Nigerian professional footballer who plays as a defensive midfielder for Miami FC in the USL Championship.

Career

Youth and college
Born in Lagos, Nigeria, Akinyode moved to the United States and joined the New York Red Bulls Academy. He captained the U-16 Academy team and was a member of the under-18 and under-23 squads. Akinyode also played  college soccer for Seton Hall University from 2011 to 2014. While with the Pirates the holding midfielder played in 63 matches scoring 5 goals and recording 4 assists.

He also played in the Premier Development League for NJ-LUSO Parma.

Professional
Akinyode signed with New York Red Bulls II on April 18, 2015. He made his debut for the club on the same day, appearing as a second-half substitute in a 1-1 draw against the Charleston Battery. On September 5, 2015 Akinyode scored his goal as a professional, scoring the winning goal on a late header in a 3-2 victory over Louisville City FC.

On December 11, 2015, Akinyode signed with Bethlehem Steel FC.

On January 30, 2017, North Carolina FC announced they had signed Akinyode.

On January 4, 2018, Akinyode signed with USL side Nashville SC.

On December 17, 2019, Akinyode joined Birmingham Legion FC.

On January 15, 2021, Akinyode signed with USL Championship side Miami FC.

International
Akinyode has represented  Nigeria at the U-14 national team level. In 2012 Akinyode was called up for a United States men's national under-20 soccer team training camp by Tab Ramos.

References

External links 
shupirates.com player profile 
NPSL Profile

1994 births
Living people
Nigerian footballers
Nigerian expatriate footballers
Seton Hall Pirates men's soccer players
New York Red Bulls U-23 players
NJ-LUSO Parma players
New York Red Bulls II players
Philadelphia Union II players
North Carolina FC players
Nashville SC (2018–19) players
Birmingham Legion FC players
Miami FC players
Association football midfielders
Expatriate soccer players in the United States
USL League Two players
USL Championship players
Sportspeople from Lagos
Yoruba sportspeople
Nigerian expatriate sportspeople in the United States